Understanding Power: The Indispensable Chomsky, published in 2002, is a collection of previously unpublished transcripts of seminars, talks, and question-and-answer sessions conducted by Noam Chomsky from 1989 to 1999.

The transcripts were compiled and edited by Peter R. Mitchell and John Schoeffel. Mitchell and Schoeffel are public defenders in New York.

Content
The book's ten chapters draw on discussions at various speaking engagements in the United States and Canada.

 "Weekend Teach-In: Opening Session" (Rowe, Massachusetts, 15–16 April 1989)
 "Teach-In: Over Coffee" (Rowe, Massachusetts, 15–16 April 1989)
 "Teach-In: Evening" (Rowe, Massachusetts, 15–16 April 1989)
 "Colloquy" (Fort Collins, Colorado, 10 April 1990)
 "Ruling the World" (New York, Massachusetts, Maryland, Colorado, Illinois, and Ontario in 1990 and 1993–96)
 "Community Activists" (British Columbia, Massachusetts, Illinois, Maryland, and Wyoming in 1989 and 1993–96)
 "Intellectuals and Social Change" (Woods Hole and Rowe, Massachusetts in 1989 and 1993–94)
 "Popular Struggle" (Massachusetts, Maryland, Ontario, California, and Wyoming in 1989 and 1993–96)
 "Movement Organizing" (Woods Hole, Massachusetts in 1993 and 1996)
 "Turning Point" (Illinois, New Jersey, Massachusetts, New York, and Maryland in 1994–96 and 1999)

See also
 Deterring Democracy (1991)
 Manufacturing Consent: The Political Economy of the Mass Media (1988)
 Noam Chomsky bibliography
 Noam Chomsky's political views

References

External links

 Official website 

2002 non-fiction books
Books by Noam Chomsky
Books critical of capitalism
Books about imperialism
Books about media bias
Books about propaganda
Books about public opinion
Books about politics of the United States
Books about foreign relations of the United States
The New Press books